The 1966 Columbia Lions football team was an American football team that represented Columbia University during the 1966 NCAA University Division football season. Columbia finished sixth in the Ivy League. 

In their tenth season under head coach Aldo "Buff" Donelli, the Lions compiled a 2–7 record and were outscored 306 to 156. Richard Flory and Robert Hast were the team captains.  

The Lions' 2–5 conference record placed sixth in the Ivy League standings. Columbia was outscored 231 to 122 by Ivy opponents. 

Columbia played its home games at Baker Field in Upper Manhattan, in New York City.

Schedule

References

Columbia
Columbia Lions football seasons
Columbia Lions football